Pilocrocis phaeocoryla is a moth in the family Crambidae. It was described by Jean Ghesquière in 1942. It is found in the Democratic Republic of the Congo.

References

Pilocrocis
Moths described in 1942
Moths of Africa